Percy Frank Bush (23 June 1879 – 19 May 1955) was a Welsh rugby union player who played international rugby for Wales on eight occasions. Playing at fly-half, Bush is regarded as one of the most talented Welsh players of the pre-First World War era.

Rugby career
Bush played most of his career for Cardiff RFC making 171 appearances and scoring 66 tries between 1899 and 1913. He captained the club for three seasons. He won eight caps for Wales (1905–1910), including for the famous Match of the Century, the 1905 victory over New Zealand. He also played in four tests for the 1904 British Isles on their tour to Australia and New Zealand. This was before he had been capped by Wales. He was the undoubted star of the tour, being dubbed 'Will o' the Wisp' by the Australian press for his devastating play.

Cricket career
Bush also played county cricket for Glamorgan County Cricket Club and Marylebone Cricket Club. He played in three Minor Counties Cricket Championship matches between 1900 and 1903, all for Glamorgan. His first Minor Counties match was at St Helens against Wiltshire in 1900. Bush scored just 5 runs in his first innings, but his Glamorgan team won the match before he was required in the second innings. Bush failed to improve in his second match, played against Berkshire at the Cardiff Arms Park in 1902; scoring a single run in his only innings. Despite this Glamorgan won by an innings and ten runs. His final encounter for Glamorgan, was against a Surrey Second XI in 1903. Glamorgan lost the match by 61 runs, and Bush failed to enhance his record with 6 runs over two innings.

References

External links

Wales international rugby union players
British & Irish Lions rugby union players from Wales
1879 births
1955 deaths
Rugby union players from Cardiff
Alumni of Cardiff University
Cardiff RFC players
London Welsh RFC players
Penygraig RFC players
Glamorgan cricketers
Welsh cricketers
Glamorgan County RFC players
Rugby union scrum-halves